Uthukkottai taluk is a taluk of Tiruvallur district of the Indian state of Tamil Nadu. The headquarters of the taluk is the town of Uthukkottai.

Demographics
According to the 2011 census, the taluk of Uthukkottai had a population of 149,991 with 74,079 males and 75,912 females. There were 1025 women for every 1000 men. The taluk had a literacy rate of 62.34. Child population in the age group below 6 was 7,803 Males and 7,581 Females.

Points of interest
 Sri Bhavani Amman Temple in Periapalayam
 Surutapalli Pallikondeswarar Temple,
 Gangaikonda cholapuram temple a UNESCO site in Gangaikonda cholapuram is nearly 2 km from the taluk about 2 km from the town of Uthukkottai, has the only "Sayana Sivan" (sleeping Siva), which is called 'Pallikondeswarar.

Towns and villages
Uthukkottai Taluk has one town, the panchayat town of Uthukkottai, and eighty-eight villages.  At the 2011 census, three of the villages had populations over 5000: Pennalurpet, Periyapalayam, and Vadamadurai. The villages are:

References 

{Puducherry village}

Taluks of Tiruvallur district